The Memories of Angels is a 2008 collage film by Luc Bourdon.

Summary
Created entirely from stock footage from over 120 National Film Board of Canada (NFB) films, as an homage to the city of Montreal in the 1950s and 1960s. Bourdon incorporates material from films by such well-known directors as Michel Brault, Claude Jutra, Gilles Groulx,  Denys Arcand and Arthur Lipsett.

Production
Created by the NFB to help mark its 70th anniversary, the idea for the film had originated 15 years earlier, during a conversation between Bourdon and NFB producer Colette Loumède about making a documentary film entirely from other  movies. Pouring over the vintage footage, Bourdon chose his hometown of Montreal  — also the headquarters of the NFB — to be the central character of the film, since no other actor would appear throughout the film.

Accolades
The film received the award for best Quebec film at the Festival du Nouveau Cinema. It was also chosen by the Toronto International Film Festival for that year's Canada's Top Ten.

Sequel
A sequel film, The Devil's Share (La Part du diable), was released in 2018, using the same format to present a portrait of Montreal in the 1970s.

See also
Montreal Stories, an anthology film about Montreal
Of Time and the City, a collage film about Liverpool
Arthur Lipsett

References

External links
Watch The Memories of Angels at NFB.ca
The Memories of Angels: A Cinematic Essay, an interview with Luc Bourdon
Regional Educational Television Network

2008 films
Quebec films
Films shot in Montreal
Films set in Montreal
National Film Board of Canada documentaries
Documentary films about Montreal
Collage film
Canadian avant-garde and experimental films
2000s Canadian films